Francoise Brun-Cottan (born 1944) is a French-American actress.

She provided the voice of Nibbles in the Tom & Jerry shorts in the 1950s era. Brun-Cottan voices Nibbles in shorts like The Two Mouseketeers, and Tuffy in Tom and Jerry. Brun-Cottan was six years old when she voiced Nibbles in The Two Mouseketeers. 

She was one of the street kids in An American in Paris in 1951 and had bit parts in other movies. Brun-Cottan also voiced Fifi in Tex Avery's animated short The Flea Circus (1954). Her last voice acting role was reprising Nibbles for Royal Cat Nap, which was released in 1958.

Francoise went on to have an academic and research career. She became Senior Research Scientist who spent over a decade as a Work Place Ethnographer and Interaction Analyst with Xerox PARC and at the Palo Alto Research Center & Webster Research center. She now consults for libraries and government agencies as well as large corporations and research agencies, and also produces personal oral histories and memoirs for/with individuals. In the 1970s and 1980s, Brun-Cottan was one of the executives of Michael Douglas' film production company, Bigstick Productions.

References

External links
 

1944 births
Living people
Place of birth missing (living people)
American voice actresses
American child actresses
Metro-Goldwyn-Mayer cartoon studio people
20th-century American actresses
French emigrants to the United States